Tadeusz Bronisław Wałek-Czarnecki (1889–1949) was a Polish historian.

Wałek-Czarnecki studied history and archaeology at the Jagiellonian University, as a pupil of Piotr Bieńkowski. In 1910 he went abroad and studied in Berlin under E. Meyet and A. Erman, and in Paris under A. Moret.

In the winter of 1913-1914 he took part in the Austrian excavations at Giza conducted by Junker. At the International Congress of Population (Paris 1937) he presented a paper La population de l'Egypte ancienne.

Professor of Ancient History at the University of Warsaw, during the years 1939-1941 and 1945 he stayed at IFAO, Cairo, from 1949 he resided in England.

Historia Grecji, 1934.
Dzieje ekonomiczne świata starożytnego, 1948.

Jagiellonian University alumni
Academic staff of the University of Warsaw
20th-century Polish historians
Polish male non-fiction writers
1889 births
1949 deaths